Preston Reed  is an album by American guitarist Preston Reed, a compilation of his earlier albums Pointing Up and Playing by Ear.

Track listing
All songs by Preston Reed.
 "Whirewhip"
 "Groundhog"
 "Cane Bay"
 "Gone But Not Forgotten"
 "Gittel and Jerry's Theme"
 "A Day at the Races"
 "Fun with Wally"
 "Suite Hoodeet"
 "View from Afar"
 "Potato Pancake"
 "Playing by Ear"
 "Southern Exposure"
 "Accufuse"
 "No More Than a Smile"
 "Digitalia"
 "Moment Too Soon"
 "Din Vin Fou"
 "False Spring"
 "Basta Pasta"
 "Last Scene in September"

Personnel
Preston Reed - 6 & 12-string acoustic guitars

References

Preston Reed albums
1990 compilation albums